Jonathan Robert William Harvey (born 3 February 1944) is a former English first-class cricketer who played for Cambridge University from 1963 to 1965.

Jonathan Harvey attended Marlborough College, where he captained the First XI, before going up to Christ's College, Cambridge. An opening bowler, he gained his blue in 1965. His best first-class figures were 5 for 28 against Somerset in 1965, in a match that Somerset nevertheless won by an innings. He took 3 for 47 and 4 for 78 against Glamorgan a week later. The next match was the University Match, in which he took three wickets and took part in an unbroken tenth-wicket partnership with Rupert Roopnaraine that yielded no runs but prevented defeat.

He became a barrister.

References

External links
 

1944 births
Living people
People from Yeovil
People educated at Marlborough College
Alumni of Christ's College, Cambridge
English cricketers
Cambridge University cricketers
English barristers